Antrops is a genus of flies belonging to the family lesser dung flies from Chile (Magallanes, Cape Horn), Falkland Islands & South Georgia Island.

Species
A. truncipennis  Enderlein, 1909

References

Sphaeroceridae
Diptera of South America
Sphaeroceroidea genera
Fauna of the Falkland Islands